Andrea Philipp (born 29 July 1971) is a retired German sprinter. A three-time Olympian, she won a bronze medal in the 200 metres at the 1999 World Championships (tied with Merlene Frazer), and a gold medal in the 100 metres at the 1990 World Junior Championships.

Biography
Born in Bützow, her personal best time in the 200 metres is 22.25 seconds, achieved during the heats of the 1999 World Championships in Seville. This places her eighth on the German all-time list, behind Marita Koch, Heike Drechsler, Marlies Göhr, Silke Gladisch, Bärbel Wöckel, Katrin Krabbe and Gesine Walther. In the 100 metres she has a personal best time of 11.05 seconds, achieved in June 1997 in Dortmund.

She competed for the clubs Schweriner SC, TV Schriesheim and LG Olympia Dortmund during her active career.

International competitions 

(#) Indicates overall position in qualifying heats (h) quarterfinals (qf) or semifinals (sf).

See also
 German all-time top lists - 200 metres

References

External links 
 
 
 

1971 births
Living people
People from Bützow
People from Bezirk Schwerin
German female sprinters
German national athletics champions
Olympic athletes of Germany
Athletes (track and field) at the 1992 Summer Olympics
Athletes (track and field) at the 1996 Summer Olympics
Athletes (track and field) at the 2000 Summer Olympics
World Athletics Championships medalists
European Athletics Championships medalists
20th-century German women
Olympic female sprinters
Sportspeople from Mecklenburg-Western Pomerania